Admiral Fowler may refer to:

Earl B. Fowler Jr. (1925–2008), U.S. Navy vice admiral
Jeffrey Fowler (born 1956), U.S. Navy vice admiral
Joe Fowler (1894–1993), U.S. Navy rear admiral